A musicologist is someone who studies music (see musicology). A historical musicologist studies music from a historical perspective. An ethnomusicologist studies music in its cultural and social contexts (see ethnomusicology). A systematic musicologist asks general questions about music from the perspective of relevant disciplines (psychology, sociology, acoustics, philosophy, physiology, computer science) (see systematic musicology). Systematic musicologists often identify more strongly with their non-musical discipline than with musicology.

Historical musicologists

Mário de Andrade
Carolyn Abbate
Byron Adams
Guido Adler
Miguel Álvarez-Fernández
August Wilhelm Ambros
Willi Apel
Denis Arnold
Philippe A. Autexier
Eva Badura-Skoda
Margaret Bent
Heinrich Besseler
Peter Bloom
Philip Brett
Rae Linda Brown
Howard Mayer Brown
Charles Faulkner Bryan
Michael J. Budds
J. Peter Burkholder
Dimitrije Bužarovski
Manfred Bukofzer
Roberto Carnevale
Peter Case
Federico Celestini
Samuel Charters
Richard Charteris
Friedrich Chrysander
Edward T. Cone
Charles-Edmond-Henri de Coussemaker
Ry Cooder
Ludwig Czaczkes
Carl Dahlhaus
Thurston Dart
John Daverio 
Dalibor Davidović
Joshua F. Drake
S. A. K. Durga
Alfred Einstein
Alexander John Ellis
Séamus Ennis
Robert Fink
François-Joseph Fétis
Paul Gambaccini
Karl Geiringer
Tula Giannini
Roger Mathew Grant
Robert Greenberg
Donald Jay Grout
Ursula Günther
Bartol Gyurgieuvits
Harry Halbreich
Roger Lee Hall
Mickey Hart
Daniel Heartz
Seppo Heikinheimo
Sam Henry
Willy Hess
Ernst Hilmar
H. Wiley Hitchcock
Hans-Jørgen Holman
Richard Hoppin
George Pullen Jackson
Richard Jackson
Simon P. Keefe
Joseph Kerman
Otto Kinkeldey
Jerome Kohl
Lawrence Kramer
Paul-Gilbert Langevin
Kendra Preston Leonard
Robert Lissauer
Lewis Lockwood
Alan Lomax
John Lomax
Edward Lowinsky
Friedrich Ludwig
Ciarán Mac Mathúna
Eusebius Mandyczewski
Maria Rika Maniates
Joseph de Marliave
Susan McClary
R. C. Mehta
Otto Mayer-Serra
Lalmani Misra
Jérôme-Joseph de Momigny
Pierre Monichon
Domenico Morgante
Jean-Jacques Nattiez
Anthony Newcomb
Gustav Nottebohm
Michael Nyman
Claude V. Palisca
Dom Joseph Pothier
André Pirro
Nino Pirrotta
Leon B. Plantinga
Howard Pollack
Harold Powers
Michael Praetorius
N. Ramanathan
Gustave Reese
Andrey Rimsky-Korsakov
Charles Rosen
Julian Rushton
Stanley Sadie
Camille Saint-Saëns
Adolfo Salazar
Adrienne Simpson
Elaine Sisman
Eileen Southern
Philipp Spitta
Hedi Stadlen
Rita Steblin
Paul Steinitz
Reinhard Strohm
Oliver Strunk
Carl Stumpf
Edward Tarr
Richard Taruskin
Erik W. Tawaststjerna
Nicholas Temperley
Jeff Todd Titon
Donald Tovey
Anahit Tsitsikian
Alan Tyson
Leo Treitler
Marc Vignal
James Webster
John Wilson
Christoph Wolff
Josephine Wright
Neal Zaslaw

Ethnomusicologists

Eduard Yefimovich Alekseyev
Mário de Andrade
Jaime de Angulo
Simha Arom
Jesús Bal y Gay
Béla Bartók
Judith Becker
Deben Bhattacharya
John Blacking
Constantin Brăiloiu
Mellonee V. Burnim
Joseph Canteloube
Chalkdust
Oriana Civile
Judith R. Cohen
Frances Densmore
S. A. K. Durga
Akin Euba
Walter Graf
Percy Grainger
Ida Halpern
David G. Hebert
Mantle Hood
Erich von Hornbostel
Leoš Janáček
Jean Jenkins
Arthur Morris Jones
Maud Karpeles
Margaret J. Kartomi
Zoltán Kodály  
Boris Kotlyarov
Franjo Kuhač
Jaap Kunst
Filip Kutev
Robert Lachmann
Paul-Gilbert Langevin
Argeliers León
Alan Lomax
John Lomax
William P. Malm
Portia K. Maultsby
David P. McAllester
Alan P. Merriam
Bruno Nettl
Willard Rhodes
Joel Rubin
Wilhelm Rust
Charles Seeger
Laura Alexandrine Smith
Michael Tenzer
Laxmi Ganesh Tewari
Anahit Tsitsikian
Colin Turnbull
Armas Otto Väisänen
Richard Widdess
Vinko Žganec

Systematic musicologists

Theodor W. Adorno
Aristotle
Karlheinz Brandenburg
Albert Bregman
John Chowning
Nicolas Collins
Ivor Darreg
Diana Deutsch
Renato Fasano
Gustav Fechner
Hermann von Helmholtz
Bart Hopkin
Yuri Landman
Fred Lerdahl
François-Bernard Mâche
Dario Martinelli
Richard Parncutt
Harry Partch
Pythagoras
Carl Seashore
Klaus Scherer
Carl Stumpf
Eero Tarasti
Ernst Heinrich Weber
Erv Wilson

External links

 
 Website of the International Musicological Society
 Website of the American Musicological Society
 Website of the Royal Musical Association
 Website of the American Institute of Musicology

Musicologists
 
 
Musicologists